Ulvaeus is a surname. Notable people with the surname include:

 Björn Ulvaeus (born 1945), Swedish songwriter, composer, and musician
 Linda Ulvaeus (born 1973), Swedish singer-songwriter and actress

Swedish-language surnames